Robert Louzon (1882–1976) was a French engineer, revolutionary syndicalist, anarchist and socialist.

Louzon was involved in the Confédération générale du travail and then in the anarchist Confédération nationale du travail (CNT). He helped found the journal Révolution prolétarienne with the syndicalist trade-unionist Pierre Monatte in 1924. In 1929 he joined the Communist Party of France, to leave shortly after. He later joined the SIA (Solidarité Internationale antifasciste) and signed Louis Lecoin's Paix immédiate. During World War II he was arrested and interned in Algeria.

1882 births
1976 deaths
Members of the General Confederation of Labour (France)
French socialists
French anarchists
French magazine founders
20th-century French engineers